The 1951 Temple Owls football team was an American football team that represented Temple University as an independent during the 1951 college football season. In its third season under head coach Albert Kawal, the team compiled a 6–4 record and was outscored by a total of 176 to 168. The team played its home games at Temple Stadium in Philadelphia.

Schedule

References

Temple
Temple Owls football seasons
Temple Owls football